A pin is a device used for fastening objects or material together.

Pin or PIN may also refer to:

Computers and technology
 Personal identification number (PIN), to access a secured system
 PIN pad, a PIN entry device
 PIN, a former Dutch debit card system
 An image on Pinterest
 PIN diode, a semiconductor diode
 Pin, a short lead in electronics
 Pinning, the act of attaching a social media post to the top of a page to signify importance
 To pin an object to another object in interface, such as pinning an application to the taskbar
 Pin (computer program), a platform for creating analysis tools

Awards, brooches, or fasteners
 Award pin, recognising an achievement
 Bobby pin or kirby grip or hair grip, a hairpin
 Clevis pin, a three-piece fastener system
 Collar pin, for a shirt collar
 Drawing pin or thumbtack
 Lapel pin, a small pin worn on clothing
 Pin-back button, a badge fastened to garments with a safety pin.
 Safety pin, pin which includes a simple spring mechanism and a clasp
 Split pin or cotter pin, a fastener

Music and film
 Pin (harp) a Cambodian harp
 Pin (film), 1988, Canada
 "Pin", a song by the Yeah Yeah Yeahs, from the album Fever to Tell, 2003
 "Pin", a song by Anuel AA, from the album Las Leyendas Nunca Mueren, 2021
 The Pin (comedy act), on BBC Radio 4
 "The Pin", a song from the Goo Goo Dolls' album Boxes
 Bridge pin, on a keyboard musical instrument

Sports and games
 Pin (amateur wrestling), holding an opponent down
 Pin (professional wrestling), wrestling move
 Pin (bridge), a maneuver in the game of bridge
 Pin (chess), when a defending chess piece cannot move without exposing a more valuable defending piece
 Bowling pin, the target of the bowling ball in various bowling games
 Gabriele Pin (born 1962), Italian footballer

Other uses
 Pin, Haute-Saône, French commune
 Police Information Notice in the UK
 Postal code, a series of digits or letters used in a postal address
 Postal Index Number, postal code of locations in India
 PIN Group, a German postal company
 People in Need (Czech Republic), a non-profit, non-governmental organization
 Paleontological Institute, Russian Academy of Sciences, Moscow, Russia
 PIN proteins in plants
 Progressive inflammatory neuropathy, a disease
 Prostatic intraepithelial neoplasia, an abnormality of prostatic glands
 Center pin, on railway vehicles
 Dowel or dowel pin
 Preferred IUPAC name, a chemical name
 Abbreviation of Pinxit
 Half a firkin in English brewery cask units
 Pinacolate group, sometimes abbreviated pin

See also
PINS (disambiguation)  Includes "Pins"
 Hairpin (disambiguation)
 Kingpin (disambiguation)
 Pinning (disambiguation)
 Pinhead (disambiguation)